The Return of Rin Tin Tin is a 1947 American drama film directed by Max Nosseck and written by Jack DeWitt. The film stars Rin Tin Tin III, Donald Woods, Robert Blake, Claudia Drake, Steve Pendleton and Earle Hodgins. The film was released on November 1, 1947, by Eagle-Lion Films.

The story of a boy, a priest, and a dog.

Cast
Rin Tin Tin III as Rin Tin Tin
Donald Woods as Father Matthew
Robert Blake as Paul the Refugee Lad 
Claudia Drake as Mrs. Graham
Steve Pendleton as Gordon Melrose 
Earle Hodgins as Joe

Accolades
The film is recognized by American Film Institute in these lists:
 2003: AFI's 100 Years...100 Heroes & Villains:
 Rin Tin Tin – Nominated Hero

References

External links
 

1947 films
1940s English-language films
American drama films
1947 drama films
Films directed by Max Nosseck
Films about dogs
Eagle-Lion Films films
Rin Tin Tin
1940s American films